The Saint Helena shearwater (Puffinus pacificoides) is an extinct species of seabird in the petrel family. It is known only from subfossil remains found on the island of Saint Helena in the South Atlantic Ocean. It probably became extinct at the end of the last glacial period, or the early Holocene, as the climate became warmer.

Etymology
The specific name of the taxon comes from pacificus plus Greek oides (like or resembling), from its relationship to the living species Puffinus pacificus.

References

Sources
 
 

Saint Helena shearwater
Holocene extinctions
†
Late Quaternary prehistoric birds
Cenozoic birds of Africa
Extinct birds of Atlantic islands
Saint Helena shearwater